İclal Aydın (born 14 September 1971) is a Turkish actress, writer, journalist, and TV presenter. She is best known for popular comedy family series "İki Aile".

Life and career 
Born to a Circassian mother and a Kurdish father, Aydın's family were residents of Nevşehir at the time of her birth. The family moved to Ankara one year later due to her father's new position. She was then educated at Elazığ Anatolian High School. With her parents divorce, she returned to Ankara and spent her high school years writing and staging theatre plays. In 1989, she enrolled in Ankara University's School of Language and History – Geography, but left the school in her second year and moved to Berlin, where she worked as a stage actress for six years.

After returning to Turkey in 1996, she landed a job at a television channel in 1997. In the same year, she appeared in Ayna's music video "Ölünce Sevemezsem Seni". She further rose to prominence with her role in the series Sıcak Saatler. She then started presenting the women's program 2'den 4'e on HBB. After working for Kanal D, she held positions ar Radyo D, Radyo Cumhuriyet, Radyo Kent, and BRT FM between 1998 and 2000. In 1999, she presented Hayat Güzeldir on BRT. The diaries and information gathered for Hayat Güzeldir formed the basis of her first book. Between 2006 and 2008, Aydın starred in Star TV's İki Aile as Eda. In 2012, she appeared as Behice on the Kanal D series Veda. She subsequently had a supporting role on O Hayat Benim. In July 2016, Aydın began presenting her own program İclal Aydın'la Yeniden on Show TV. In 2018, she starred in TRT1's Ege'nin Hamsisi. As of 2022, she has a leading role on the Kanal D series Üç Kız Kardeş.

Personal life 
Aydın has been married four times and has a daughter, named Zeynep Lal, with Kemal Başbuğ. Between 2006 and 2007 she was married to Tuna Kiremitçi.

Filmography

Film and TV series 

 1995: Bir Demet Tiyatro
 1995: Mirasyediler
 1998: Sıcak Saatler
 2000: Yarın Geç Olmayacak
 2000: Vizontele
 2000: Zor Hedef
 2001: Dedem, Gofret ve Ben
 2003: Vizontele Tuuba
 2004: Avrupa Yakası
 2005: Organize İşler
 2006–2008: İki Aile
 2009: Güldünya
 2009: Haneler
 2012: Göç Zamanı
 2012: Gına
 2012: Aşkın Halleri
 2012: Veda
 2014: O Hayat Benim
 2018: Ege'nin Hamsisi
 2022–: Üç Kız Kardeş

TV and radio programs 
 2'den 4'e (presenter)
 1998–2000: Radyo D, Radyo Cumhuriyet, Radyo Kent BRT FMD
 1999: Hayat Güzeldir
 2014: Arkadaşım Hoşgeldin (guest)
 2016: İclal Aydın'la Yeniden

Bibliography 

 2001: Hayat Güzeldir
 2003: Bitmiş Aşklar Emanetçisi
 2004: Yaz Bitmesin
 2005: Gördüğüme Sevindim
 2009: Evlerin Işıkları Bir Bir Yanarken
 2009: Senin Adın Bile Geçmedi
 2010: Kağıt Kesikleri
 2011: Zeynep Lal Büyürken – "Resimler Rengarenkler"
 2011: Zeynep Lal Büyürken – "Kanatlar"
 2013: Aşk Ve Acı
 2013: Bir Cihan Kafes
 2018: Üç Kız Kardeş
 2019: Kalbimin Can Mayası
 2021: Söylenmemiş Sözler
 2021: Unutursun

References

External links 
 
 

1971 births
Living people
20th-century Turkish journalists
21st-century Turkish journalists
20th-century Turkish poets
21st-century Turkish poets
Turkish people of Circassian descent
Turkish people of Kurdish descent
Turkish stage actresses
Turkish television actresses
Turkish film actresses
Turkish women television presenters